Nepal Police is the national and primary law enforcement agency of Nepal. It is primarily responsible for maintaining law and order, prevention of crime and crime investigation within the jurisdiction determined by the Constitution of Nepal. Apart from its primary role, Nepal Police conducts a vast array of duties such as VIP protection, Security of Vital Installations, Traffic management, Secret services, Intelligence collection, Riot Control, Disaster management, Hostage rescue and various other Ceremonial roles. Nepal Police is currently led by Inspector General of Police Dhiraj Pratap Singh since 3 May 2022. He is the 29th IGP of Nepal Police.

History

During The Rana Regime (1864–1951 AD)
During Rana Regime, little was done to institutionalize the Police Organisation, establishing Milisiya, Thana police Chakki, office of Police director general etc. which gradually shaped The Nepal Police to this modern "Nepal Police".

During the period 1951–1990
Nepal saw the dawn of democracy after the fall of the Rana regime.
The Police Headquarters was established in 1952 in Kathmandu. Mr. Toran Shamsher J.B.Rana was appointed the first Inspector General of Police. The Police Act, 2012 BS (1955 AD) came into effect. The Police Regulation, 2015 BS (1959 AD) came into effect.

The Parliamentary Government under the multi-party system was adopted for some years which was followed by Panchayat System since 1960. The establishment of the Central Police Training Centre in 1963 A.D.

1990–present
The Peoples democratic movement of 1990 reinstated the multi party democratic system. The new constitution of the kingdom was promulgated on 9 November 1991. The Police Reform Commission was constituted in the year 1992 and Modernization of the Police Organisation started to tune with the aspirations of the people and norms of Multi-Party system. The first contingent of police personnel was deployed in UN Mission in 1991. More than 2000 police personnel have already left their feet serving the international community in blue helmet. Nepal Police is the main and principal law enforcement agency of Nepal.

Nepal Police has total 79,554 police personnel and has 2,344 permanent and 507 temporary police offices and units spread all over the country.
The present chief of Nepal Police is Dhiraj Pratap Singh.

Head of Nepal Police

The Nepalese Police is headed by the Inspector General of Police of Nepal. He reports directly to the Ministry of Home Affairs and is appointed by the Government of Nepal for a tenure of four years, although two IGPs have served for six years.

Organizational structure
There are four departments in the Police Headquarters that function to undertake the policing activities of Nepal Police. These departments are headed either by Additional Inspector General of Police (AIGP) or Deputy Inspector General of Police (DIGP). In addition to the departments, there are the National Police Academy and the Metropolitan Police Office that are being looked by Additional Inspector General of Police.

Operation and Crime Investigation Department
Head: AIGP

Central Investigation Bureau
Head: AIGP UTTAM RAJ SUBEDI

Administration Department 
Head: AIGP Niraj Bahadur Shahi

Human Resource Development Department
Head: AIGP PUJA SINGH

Nepal Police Hospital
Medical Director: AIGP Dr. Asha Singh

Nepal Police Hospital was inaugurated by the late king Birendra Bir Bikram Shah Dev on the 27th of Chaitra, 2040 BS. It was established with an intention to provide free health services to in- service policemen, their families and ex-servicemen and their spouses. The hospital commenced OPD services and 25 bedded indoor services through 5 medical doctors, a few nurses, paramedics and administrative staff. The infrastructure then was built with the financial support of the Government of Nepal and voluntary contribution of the police personals. Some instruments and equipments were donated by the Government of India and a Japanese club. The Government of Nepal has been bearing all the expenses of the hospital ever since its establishment (infrastructure development, upgrading human resources and equipments). The routine annual budget allocated by the government to the hospital is inadequate to meet the increasing demand of health services of the staffs of the Police organization. Therefore, Prahari Kalyan Kosh (Police Welfare Fund) of Nepal Police has established a trust to provide health services to the family members of the serving policemen and ex-servicemen and their spouses. The fund supports to purchase medicines for physically and mentally handicapped and Renal Failure patients. It also provides variable additional budget every year to further support the above-mentioned group of patients. Though the spectrum of services provided by the hospital in the initial stage was minimal, it had a great positive impact on all the policemen and medical professionals.

National Police Academy
Head: AIGP 

The National Police Academy of Nepal, formerly known as the Sadar Prahari Talim Kendra, is an academic wing of Nepal Police. It is solely responsible for conducting basic and advanced training programmed for the police officers in Nepal. AIGP Rajendra Singh Bhandari is the executive director of this academy. The NPA is the apex body of all Nepal Police Training Institutions in the country. Its goal is to develop quality human resources for Nepal Police to achieve organizational and individual objectives with a strong commitment of service and responsibility to the people. The academy is set to be the 'Center for Excellence' and is committed to expand its resource base through tie-ups with similar institutions in and outside the country. The main objectives of NPA are:
 To conduct foundation training's (induction courses) by offering developmental opportunities to the senior police officers and technical police officers.
 To prepare police instructors required for the entire police training system in Nepal Police and provide consultancy services.
 To offer and undertake advanced training for senior police officers in the field of leadership, management and administration, proactive policing, community policing trainer's training, etc.
 To extend prospective and substantive relationship with universities in the relevant subjects and to award academic degrees to the trainees.
 To organize workshops, seminars, symposiums, conferences and short courses in policing issues.
 To carry out quality research activities (required by Police Headquarters-PHQ) or to act as a research faculty (qualitative research on behalf of PHQ) regarding police profession to develop analytically capability.
 To extend assistance and advice police headquarters i.e. consultancy service rendered to PHQ in formulating training policies.

Metropolitan Police Office
Head: AIGP

Metropolitan Traffic Police Division
Head: SSP Umesh Raj Joshi

Central Polygraph Section
Nepal Police has started using Polygraph system for credibility assessment in criminal and internal disciplinary investigations from 6 February 2014. Nepal Police has established "Central Polygraph Section" in Crime Investigation Department at Police Headquarters.

Research and Planning Directorate
Research and Planning (R&P)Directorate of Nepal Police was established in 1987 as the research and planning division. Now, the R&P Directorate is responsible for conducting research on the issues of institutional development and service delivery and making the plans based on the findings of the research. The directorate is responsible for conducting research and formulating plans based on the research.

Altogether 17 Research and planning sections have been established at departmental and regional levels under R&P Directorate to build a quick network to facilitate research and planning activities of Nepal police.

Uniform

Uniform of the Nepal Police consists of summer and winter gear.

Regular officers wear a light blue shirt with navy blue pants. Junior ranks wear beret while high-ranked officers wear Peaked cap (with a blue band) with most senior officers with braids on the peak.

Riot police (Special Task Force Police) wear blue DPM pattern camouflage uniforms will ball cap. Winter uniform adds a blue jacket or sweater.

Rank insignia

There are fourteen ranks in Nepal Police. Three new ranks have been recently added to Nepal Police Recently, which include Senior Sub Inspector (SSI), Senior Head Constable (SHC), and Assistant Head Constable (AHC).

The emblem of the Nepalese Police is worn on the headgear of all members. The emblem consists of:

 Flag of Nepal as the crest 
 Crossed Khukuri and police baton within wreath of leaves
 Name of police forces in Nepalese in the motto at the bottom

Source: Nepal Police

Firearms

 L1A1 Self-Loading Rifle (Origin:-)- special units
 various shotguns
 Riot gun
 Galil semi auto rifle(Origin:-)
 Colt Commando rifle (Origin:-)
 M16 rifle (Origin:-)

See also
Armed Police Force (Nepal)
Nepal Police Club
National Investigation Department of Nepal

References

External links
Official website of the Nepal Police
Police Ranks in Nepal

 
Law enforcement in Nepal